Russian Vietnamese or Vietnamese Russian may refer to:
 Russia-Vietnam relations
 Vietnamese people in Russia

See also
 Eurasian (mixed ancestry)